PACE Pre-University College (Prajna Academy for Career Excellence) is a pre-university college in Shimoga, Karnataka, India which was established in 2009.

External links
PACE on Wikimapia

Pre University colleges in Karnataka
Educational institutions established in 2009
Education in Shimoga
Universities and colleges in Shimoga district
2009 establishments in Karnataka